The Siracourt V-1 bunker is a Second World War bunker built in 1943–44 by the forces of Nazi Germany at Siracourt, a commune in the Pas-de-Calais department in the Nord-Pas-de-Calais region of France. Codenamed  (Waterworks St Pol), it was intended for use as a bomb-proof storage facility and launch site for V-1 flying bombs. However it never went into operation due to intensive Allied bombing that made it the most heavily attacked of all the German V-weapon sites, and also of all military targets in Europe during World War II.

Background 
With the Allies gaining air superiority by 1943, different sections of the Luftwaffe – which had responsibility for the V-1 – debated how best the weapons could be deployed in the face of an increased threat of aerial bombardment. The Luftwaffe's Flak division favoured dispersing V-1s to a large number of small camouflaged launch sites. However, General Erhard Milch, who was in charge of the Luftwaffe's production programme, advocated large launch bunkers. Adolf Hitler was known to be in favour of such an approach, which had already led to the construction of a massive bunker at Watten for launching V-2 missiles. In July 1943, Luftwaffe chief Hermann Göring brokered a compromise under which both alternatives would be pursued; four (and ultimately ten) heavy launch bunkers would be built along with 96 light installations.

The heavy bunkers were all intended to be built to a standard design, codenamed Wasserwerk (waterworks) to conceal their true purpose. The first two would be built in the Pas-de-Calais at Desvres near Lottinghen and Siracourt near Saint-Pol-sur-Ternoise. Two more would be built at Tamerville and at Couville on the Cotentin Peninsula near Cherbourg. It was intended that all four would be operational by December 1943, with further bunkers to be built subsequently.

Design and construction 
Its design and method of construction took into account the lessons learned from the destruction in August 1943 of the Watten bunker while it was still under construction. It was constructed on high ground about a kilometre (three-quarters of a mile) north of the Hesdin-Saint Pol road, to the north of the original site of the village of Siracourt. The German engineers adopted a new method which they called Verbunkerung, which involved first building the roof flat on the ground then excavating beneath it – sheltered from bombs – to create the rest of the facility.

The bunker would have been linked with the main railway line from Saint Pol to Abbeville, enabling trains carrying V-1s and supplies to enter the body of the structure. It was, in effect, a fortified railway tunnel with a storage area capable of housing 150 missiles and an aperture from which they would have been launched. Although Allied reconstructions imagined a single launch ramp, it is possible that the Germans intended to install two parallel ramps to increase the rate at which V-1s could be fired.

Discovery and destruction 

The Allies spotted the construction of the Siracourt bunker almost as soon as it began in September 1943, when two parallel trenches were dug and concreted to form the walls of the structure. Heavy Allied bombing hindered construction but it continued until the end of June 1944, when the site was wrecked by Tallboy bombs dropped by the Royal Air Force. By this time about 90 per cent of the concrete had been completed, apart from the end sections, but the supposedly bomb-proof structure proved unable to withstand the six-ton Tallboy. One bomb fully penetrated the roof and exploded underneath, while another caused substantial damage when it exploded next to one of the walls. The ground around the site was churned up by over 5,000 tons of bombs. By the time the site was abandoned in April 1944, the exterior had practically been completed but the excavation of the interior had only just begun. Roland Hautefeuille estimated that Siracourt was the most heavily bombed military target in all of Europe with 5,070 tons of bombs directed at it. These bombs considerably change the terrain around the site, destroying most of the village of Siracourt. After the war, the authorities quickly abandoned the idea of demolishing the bunker.  Before the land was leveled, 80 German prisoners of war removed the launching ramp facing England and partially filled in the interior of the bunker.

The Siracourt bunker is still extant today and is visible from the road. It is located on private land.

Air raids on the Siracourt site

References and notes

Bibliography

Further reading 
 Livese, Jack (2008), "Wasserwerk Siracourt",

External links 

 BattlefieldsWW2.com: "Remnants of V-1-site Wasserwerk Siracourt, and how to find it."

V-weapon subterranea
Ruins in Hauts-de-France
World War II in the Pas-de-Calais
World War II sites in France
World War II strategic bombing